Ysgol Gyfun Gymraeg Llangynwyd is the borough of Bridgend's only Welsh medium secondary school. The school opened on 3 September 2008 on the site of the former Maesteg Comprehensive Upper School in Llangynwyd.

In 2015, the school had 607 pupils across six year groups, from Year 7 to Year 13 - its full complement of year groups. The school was expected to have around 770 pupils by 2023.

The school is fed from the four Welsh medium primary schools in Bridgend County Borough, namely,
Ysgol Cynwyd Sant, Maesteg
Ysgol Bro Ogwr, Brackla
Ysgol y Ferch o'r Sger, Cornelly
Ysgol Calon y Cymoedd, Betws

The school's motto is "Dysg ... Dawn ... Dyfodol" (Learning ... Talent ... Future). Pupils are currently grouped into three houses - Garw, Ogwr, and Llynfi (representing the valleys that form the catchment area of the school).

Notable alumni
Owen Watkin

References

Secondary schools in Bridgend County Borough
Welsh-language schools
Schools in Bridgend
Educational institutions established in 2008
2008 establishments in Wales